Umri may refer to several places:

Honorary Title
The students graduated from the largest Islamic institution in South India Jamia Darussalam
Acquire the title Umri(Oomeri)

India 
 Umri, Jalaun, a town and nagar panchayat in Jalaun district, Uttar Pradesh
 Umri, Kurukshetra, a village in Haryana
 Umri Kalan, a town in Moradabad district, Uttar Pradesh
 Umri, Nanded, a city in Nanded subdivision, Nanded district, Maharashtra
 Umri taluka, taluka (after its above seat) in Nanded district, Maharashtra
 Umri Pragane Balapur, a census town in Akola district, Maharashtra
 Mohammadpur Umri, a village near Indian Air Force base of Bamrauli, Uttar Pradesh 
 Peth Umri, a city and a municipal council in Nanded district, Maharashtra

Elsewhere 
 Umri (Omri), village in Iran